The Byrranga Mountains (Gory Byrranga) are a mountain range in the middle of the Taymyr Peninsula, Siberia, Russia.

Even though they were first explored in 1736, the Byrranga Mountains are one of the least known areas of the Arctic. The climate is continental and harsh, with frequent blizzards in the winter.

This mountain range falls into the Krasnoyarsk Krai administrative division of the Russian Federation and is part of the Great Arctic State Nature Reserve, the largest nature reserve in Russia. However, the area is very remote, there is almost no population, and access is very difficult for the lack of roads and settlements.

Geography
They are located north and west of Lake Taymyr and running for about 1,100 km, forming a looping curve that runs roughly in a southwest to northeast direction. The name is from Nganasan бъранга [bəranga] 'large rocky mountain.'

The range has deep canyons and ravines, as well as a few small glaciers in its eastern zones.

Rivers Khutudabiga and Chetyrekh have their sources in the Byrranga Range. The lower Taymyr River flows northwards cutting across these mountains. The lowlands located to the north and the south of these mountains are covered with tundra, small lakes and wetlands (bogs and marshes).

Geology
The Byrranga Range is a Hercynian formation rejuvenated during the Alpine orogeny. It is mainly made up of siltstones and intrusive rocks of neutral composition. There are also vast areas of exposed limestone formation.

See also
Urstromtal

References

External links
 Taymyr area information (Picture of the Byrranga mountains over a lake)
 Taimirsky - Pictures

Mountain ranges of Russia
Landforms of Krasnoyarsk Krai